Sudhanshu ji (born 2 May 1955 ) is a preacher from India and the founder of Vishwa Jagriti Mission(VJM). .He has over 10 million devotees around the world with more than 2.5 million as disciples.

Biography
Sudhanshu was born on the second of May 1955 in a respected family of Haripur near Usand (Smart Village) in the district of Saharanpur which is located in the land situated between the river Ganga and Yamuna in the sub-hilly area of Shivalik range in the north of India. The process of his education continued to operate from the school to the Gurukul and from the Gurukul to the University. At the age of 20 he continued to learn under the guidance of Professor of Philosophy, Shri Nandkishore, in Haridwar. He got an opportunity to gather knowledge from a forest saint, Shri Prakashanandji. After completing his University Education at the age of 22 he set out on a journey to explore India. He completed his pilgrimage to all the four religious posts and numerous places of worship in the country. He married in January 1978. Yogi Shri Sadanandji Maharaj advised Sudhanshu, who continued to practice meditation under his guidance. With the encouragement provided by Swami Muktananadji, he established the Vishwa Jagriti Mission, on 24 March 1991, the birthday of Lord Rama. The Vishwa Jagriti Mission became a huge organisation affecting more than four million people.

References

1955 births
Living people
Indian Hindu missionaries
20th-century Hindu religious leaders
21st-century Hindu religious leaders